Kerry's Eye is a weekly local newspaper in County Kerry, Ireland. It is published every Thursday and, as of 2010, had a claimed circulation of approximately 25,000.

Husband and wife, Pádraig Kennelly and Joan Kennelly, founded the newspaper in the basement on their home on Ashe Street in Tralee in 1974. Its headquarters are located in Ashe Street, Tralee. It is now the only independent newspaper in Kerry with its main competitors, The Kerryman and The Kingdom, being owned by Independent News & Media and Thomas Crosbie Holdings respectively.

Pádraig Kennelly retired as the newspaper's editor in 2010 and Kerry's Eye journalist Colin Lacey replaced him. Kennelly was the longest serving editor of a regional newspaper in Ireland at the time of his retirement. He continued to write a weekly newspaper column until his death on 21 May 2011. As of 2017, the editor was Ger Colleran who succeeded Colin Lacey in 2017.  Kerry's Eye is still owned and run by the Kennelly family.

On 3 November 2022, it was announced that the owners of the Kerry’s Eye newspaper are considering moving the paper’s production from its current base in Tralee.

References

External links
Nationwide Interview – RTÉ interview, Nationwide, 6 October 2006.

1974 establishments in Ireland
Mass media in County Kerry
Newspapers published in the Republic of Ireland
Publications established in 1974
Tralee
Weekly newspapers published in Ireland